Turn is the eponymously titled third full-length offering from the Irish indie trio Turn. Turn offered a more pop/singer songwriter direction for Meath based band. Their first album, Antisocial, had shown a strong Pixies style influence, their second album, Forward, offered an even darker side to the band's sound, but with Turn they showed they were not getting any darker. The album was a mixture of catchy pop tunes such as "It's About Nothing" and "Stop", and also more Elliott Smith inspired tunes, such as "Close Your Eyes" and "Wildside".

Opinions were very mixed about the album among fans and critics. Some called it a mile stone in musical growth for the band, others claimed it was a last-ditch effort by the band to become more commercial and popular on the Irish airwaves. However, the strength of the songs proved themselves and became live favourites instantly on the tours that followed.

Track listing 
 It's about Nothing
 Stop
 No Ones Gonna Change Your Life But You
 It's A Waste of My Time
 Close Your Eyes
 Sorry's Just A Word
 So Lame
 Too Beat
 All These Days
 Wildside
 Little Bird 
 I Don't Wanna Waste More Time

All tracks written by Ollie Cole

Personnel
 Ollie Cole - Lead Vocals, Guitars, Piano
 Ian Melady - Drums, Backing Vocals
 Ciran Kavanagh - Bass, Backing Vocals

References

External links
 Turn at Irish Music Central

2005 albums
Turn (band) albums